Gita Kumari Yadav is a Nepalese politician who is elected member of Provincial Assembly of Madhesh Province from Nepali Congress. Yadav is a resident of Rajbiraj.

References

External links

Living people
Members of the Provincial Assembly of Madhesh Province
Madhesi people
People from Rajbiraj
Nepali Congress politicians from Madhesh Province
1971 births